Walnut Township is one of eighteen townships in Appanoose County, Iowa, United States. As of the 2010 census, its population was 894.

Geography
According to the USGS, it contains six cemeteries: Bohm, Elgin, Forbush, Highland, Shaeffer and Zimmer.

References

External links
 US-Counties.com
 City-Data.com

Townships in Appanoose County, Iowa
Townships in Iowa